Tavarelli is a surname. Notable people with the surname include: 

 Gianluca Maria Tavarelli (born 1964), Italian director and screenwriter
 Ricardo Tavarelli (born 1970), Paraguayan footballer
 Zoe Tavarelli (born 1996), Italian actress